Mjölby Turabdin FC is a Swedish football club located in Mjölby.

Background
Mjölby Turabdin FC currently plays in Division 4 Östergötland Västra which is the sixth tier of Swedish football. They play their home matches at the Kungshögaplan in Mjölby.

Mjölby Turabdin FC are affiliated to Östergötlands Fotbollförbund.

Season to season

See also
List of Assyrian-Syriac football teams in Sweden

Footnotes

External links
 Mjölby Turabdin FC – Official website

Football clubs in Östergötland County
1993 establishments in Sweden